Bela Shende is an Indian playback singer. She performed several songs in Bollywood and regional films. "Mann Mohana" from the film Jodhaa Akbar, "Su Che" from the film What's Your Raashee?, "Wajle Ki Baara" and "Apsara Aali" from Natarang are some of her famous songs. In 2014 she was awarded the National Film Award for Best Female Playback Singer for the song "Khurkhura" from the Marathi film Tuhya Dharma Koncha.

Shende started her career with the music album "Kaisa Yeh Jadoo" which was well received by the masses and was critically acclaimed. Her career in Bollywood started with the film Tera Mera Saath Rahen where she voiced for a brief part. She again got a big break in the 2005 submission for Academy Award, Paheli, where she voiced Rani Mukerji. In 2008 she crooned a bhajan in the Ashutosh Gowariker directorial Jodhaa Akbar for an A. R. Rahman composition and got an IIFA Award for Best Female Playback nomination for the song.

She then crooned hits in Marathi, her mother tongue, and received several awards and nominations for her excellence. Her renditions of lavnis "Apsara Aali" and "Vajle Ki Baara" from the Marathi film Natarang were well received. She became the sole voice of Kangana Ranaut in the 2013 musical Rajjo. Bela is credited as a talented vocalist and has established a career in the Marathi film industry. Besides Hindi, she has also sung in Marathi, Urdu, Tamil, Telugu and Malayalam.

Early life and career

Early life
Bela Shende was born to Sanjeev Shende and Medha Shende. Her Grandmother, Kusum Shende, is a classical vocalist from the Kirana Gharana. Her sister Sawani Shende is also a classical vocalist. Bela is a graduate in commerce.

Career
Bela Shende won the Zee Saregama reality TV singing contest at the age of 16.

Bela has lent her voice for various music directors most notably Ilayaraja, A. R. Rahman, Shankar–Ehsaan–Loy, Ajay–Atul, Yuvan Shankar Raja, Lalit Pandit, M. M. Keeravaani and Sohail Sen. She went on to receive the National Film Award for Best Female Playback Singer, for rendering the song "Khurkhura", in the year 2014 at the 61st National Film Awards.

Bela's rendition of lavnis in the film Natarang won her widespread critical acclaim. Her renditions of "Apsara Aali" and "Vajle ki Bara" became cult songs over time. Initially she lent her voice to Aishwarya Rai Bachchan in the epic historical drama Jodhaa Akbar, directed by Ashutosh Gowariker. She then went ahead to lend her voice for Priyanka Chopra in the film What's Your Rashee?, another Ashutosh Gowariker directorial.

In 2013 she became the sole voice of Kangana Ranaut in the musical drama Rajjo. The same year she sang Khurkhura for the film Tuhya Dharma Koncha which earned her National Award. Bela Shende next worked for A. R. Rahman in the Tamil film Kaaviya Thalaivan (2014 film), its Malayalam version Pradhinayagan and Telugu Version Premaalayam for three versions of two different songs respectively.

In 2016, she recorded the title song for the film Mohenjo Daro along with Arijit Singh, A.R. Rahman and Sanah Moidutty. The song was composed by A.R. Rahman with lyrics penned by Javed Akhtar.

She sang the song "Marathi Breathless" from the album Kanherichi Phule which was composed and directed by Tejas Chavan. The album won the award for best music album at Chitra Padarpan Puraskar.

Discography

Television Serial Title Songs

Marathi
 Sa re ga ma pa
 Jodi Jamli Re
 Daiva Janile Kuni
 Ha Khel Savalyancha
 Ek Zoka
 Ayushachya Walanavar
 Antarpaat
 Anubandha
 Olakh
 Prajakta
 Vrundaavan
 Paarijaat
 nakushi
 Abhas Ha
 Swapnachya Palikadle

Hindi
 Geeta 
 Mrs. Kaushik Ki Paanch Bahuein
 Choti Bahu
 Kyun Utthe Dil Chhod Aaye

Albums
 ‘Hridayamadhle Gaane’ Marathi songs album released by Fountain music. 
 Sang in Shri Taufiq Quereshi's fusion album named ‘Taa Dhaa’. 
 ‘Sapney’ Hindi songs album released by Zee Music. 
 ‘Kaisa Yeh Jadoo’ Hindi songs album released by Magnasound (Audio & Video). 
 ‘Mazya Manaa’, Marathi songs album released by Fountain Music. ‘Doorchya Raanat’, Marathi songs Album on the songs written by N. D. Mahanor, released by Sony Music. 
 ‘Pandharicha Swami’ Marathi Abhang album released by fountain music.. 
 ‘Motiyancha chur’ a Marathi songs album released by TimesMusic. 
 ’Sahaj Tuzi Gaath Pade’ Marathi album which includes 8 songs written by the greatest Marathi poet Ga. Di.Madgulkar released by Uttam Pushpa. 
 ‘Son Chapha’Marathi songs album released by Fountain music. 
 ‘Man Mor ’ Marathi songs album released by Fountain Music. 
 ‘Pahila Vahila Prem’ Marathi album released by Fountain music. 
 ‘Gandha Halke Halke’ Marathi songs album released by Fountain music. 
 ‘Arpan’ Marathi songs album comprising eight songs which she composed and one written by her Father and Guru Dr. Sanjeev Shende. 
 Has sung for many commercial jingles and devotional albums like Gayatri Mantra, He Ram, etc.

Awards

 Best Female Playback Singer – National Film Awards 2014 – Tuhya Dharma Koncha ("Khurkhura") Marathi.
 Female Vocalist of the year Mirchi Music Awards 2009 for the song "Mann Mohana" from "Jodhaa Akbar". 
 Mirchi Music Award 2014 (marathi) for best playback singer for the song "olyaa saanjweli" from the film premachi goshta
 Mirchi Music Award 2014 (marathi) for the song of the year " olyaa saanjaweli" from the film premachi goshta.
 Marathi mirchi music awards 2014 - Best playback singer for song bavare prem he from the film bavare prem he, Listeners choice award for film Timepass.
 Mirchi Music Award 2014 (marathi) for best film album of the year "mangalashtak once more"
 Best Playback Singer Female- Bela Shende – Zee Gaurav Award 2010– Wajle Ki Bara
 Best Playback Singer Female- Bela Shende – BIG FM awards 2010 – Apsara Aali
 Best Playback Singer Female- Bela Shende – V Shantaram awards 2010 – Kashi Mi Jau Mathurechya Bajari
 Winner of the TVS Sa Re Ga Ma Mega Final – 1998
 RAPA National Award – "Best playback singer" for ZHALE MOKALE AKASH
 Raja Mantri Smruti Puraskar at the hands of Vijay Tendulkar
 Nargis Dutt Award
 IMI ZEE Sangeet Award for the Debut Singer for 1999–2000 for the album 'KAISA YEH JADOO' at the hands of Bhupen Hazarika and Ravindra Jain.
 Pune Ki Asha award
 Suheel Sneha Award at the hands of the then Chief Minister of Maharashtra Sushilkumar Shinde
 "Ga Di Ma Award" by Ga Di Ma Pratishthan
 "Vidya Pradnya Puraskar"
 Chitradrushti award 2015 for best playback singer for the song ratra kali from the film 7 roshan villa.
 IMA(Indian Music academy) Award for outstanding contribution in playback singing for consecutive 5 years.
 Pu.La Tarunaai puraskar (in the name of late Shri Pu.La Deshpande) for outstanding contribution in music.
 Zee Gaurav Nomination 2014 for best playback singer for the song "reshami bandhane" from the film Lagna Pahave Karun
 MA.TA.sanmaan nomination (maharashtra time nomination) 2014 for best playback singer for the song olyaa saanjaweli from the film premachi goshta.
 Maharashtrachi fav gaayika 2011 for -song -aaj mhare ghar paavna from balgandharva
 Maharashtrachi favorite gaayika 2011 for the song 'aaj mhare ghar paavna' from the film Balgandharva.
 MIFTA 2011 LONDON - Best Playback Singer for the Song "AAJ MHARE GHAR PAVANA", Film - BALGANDHARVA
 Nominated for State Award 2011 – best playback singer of the year 2011 for the film "Dhusar (Marathi)", song "Daatalele Dhuke…"
 Kaladarpan Puraskar 2011 for best playback singer for the Marathi film "Debu"
 MIFTA AWARDS(Marathi International Film and Theatre Awards) Dubai 2010- Best Playback Singer for WAJLE KI BARA from the film Natarang.
 Nominated for the song Mann Mohana In All Prestigious Award Functions like the "I I F A Award", Stardust Award etc.
 MA.TA. SANMAAN 2010 BEST PLAYBACK SINGER for the film NATRANG
 ZEE GAURAV PURASKAR BEST PLAYBACK SINGER-NATRANG
 KALAGAURAV PURASKAR
 MAHARASHTRA RAAJYA SHAASAN AWARD (STATE AWARD) for best playback singer of the year- NATRANG.
 V. Shantaraam Award 2010 for the song (Kasha Me Jau Mathurachya Bazari) from the film Natrang.
 Big FM Award 2010
 Sahyadri Cine Award
 RAPA NATIONAL AWARD for the Best Playback Singer for the Marathi serial on ZEE TV, Zale Mokale Aakash.
 ZEE GAURAV PURASKAR for her Marathi album PANDHARICHA SWAMI

Nominations
 IIFA Award for Best Female Playback for the song "Mann Mohana" from Jodhaa Akbar at the 10th IIFA Awards.
 Stardust Award for New Musical Sensation – Female for the song "su chhe" from the film What's Your Rashee?.
 Maharashtra State Film Awards, 2011, best female playback singer for the song "daatalele dhuke" from film "dhusar".

See also
 List of Indian playback singers

References

External links
 
 

Living people
Marathi people
Bollywood playback singers
Filmfare Awards winners
Indian women playback singers
Singers from Pune
Kannada playback singers
Marathi playback singers
Tamil playback singers
21st-century Indian singers
21st-century Indian women singers
Women musicians from Maharashtra
1982 births
Best Female Playback Singer National Film Award winners